The Slovak Sign Language is the sign language of the deaf community in Slovakia. It belongs to the French sign-language family. Bickford (2005) found that Slovak, Czech, and Hungarian Sign formed a cluster with Romanian, Bulgarian, and Polish Sign.

Despite the similarity of oral Slovak and Czech, SSL is not particularly close to Czech Sign Language.

References

French Sign Language family
Languages of Slovakia